Chouchou may refer to:

 Chouchou (film), a 2003 comedy film by Merzak Allouache, starring Gad Elmaleh and Alain Chabat
 Chayote or chouchou, an edible plant belonging to the gourd family, Cucurbitaceae
 Chouchou, a film by Henri Desfontaines
 ChouCho, Japanese singer
 Chouchou (band), Japanese electronica duo
 Hassan Alaa Eddin, a Lebanese actor and singer who is also known as Chouchou